Pseudexentera sepia is a species of tortricid moth in the family Tortricidae.

The MONA or Hodges number for Pseudexentera sepia is 3252.1.

References

Further reading

External links

 

Eucosmini
Moths described in 1986